The KD/Sport 900 is a soviet sports car manufactured in small numbers between 1963 and 1969 by a group of NAMI employees.

The Sport-900 is a 2 seat coupe with a fiberglass body powered by a 0.9L 4 cylinder engine derived from the ZAZ-965A which gave the car a top speed of 120 Km/h.

References 

Soviet automobiles
Cars of Russia
1960s cars